Opostega chalinias is a moth of the family Opostegidae. It was described by Edward Meyrick in 1893. It is known from Tasmania in Australia.

Adults have been recorded in January.

References

Opostegidae
Moths described in 1893